Serbian Americans or American Serbs, are Americans of Serb ethnic ancestry. As of 2013, there were about 190,000 American citizens who identified as having Serb ancestry. However, the number may be significantly higher, as there were some 290,000 additional people who identified as Yugoslavs living in the United States.

The group includes Serbian Americans living in the United States for one or several generations, dual Serbian–American citizens, or any other Serbian Americans who consider themselves to be affiliated with both cultures or countries.

History
 One of the first Serb immigrants to the United States was the settler George Fisher, who arrived in Philadelphia in 1815, moved to Mexico, fought in the Texan Revolution, and became a judge in California. Another notable early Serb in America was Basil Rosevic, who founded a shipping company, the Trans-Oceanic Ship Lines, around the year 1800. In the early 1800s, many Serb sailors and fishermen from Montenegro and Herzegovina immigrated to New Orleans seeking employment. In 1841, Serbs founded the Greek Orthodox parish with Greek immigrants in New Orleans, further solidifying their presence in the region.

Serbian Americans fought in the American Civil War, primarily on the side of the Confederacy, as most Serbs living in America at the time were in Louisiana and Mississippi. Several Confederate military units were formed by Serbs in Louisiana, such as the Cognevich Company (named for Stjepan Konjevic, who immigrated to Louisiana in the 1830s), and the First and Second Slavonian Rifles. At least 400 Serbs fought in these three units during the Civil War. Several other known Serbian soldiers in the Civil War came from Alabama and Florida, specifically from Pensacola.

Other Serbs settled in Alabama, Illinois, Mississippi and California, where they joined the Gold Rush. Serb immigrants first came in significant numbers to the United States in the late 19th century from the Adriatic regions of Austria-Hungary and areas of the Balkans. During this time, most Serb immigrants to the United States settled in mid-western industrial cities or in California, which had a climate similar to that of the Dalmatian coast. Serb men often found employment in mines, and numerous Serb families moved to mining towns throughout the country. Serbian miners and their families also settled in great numbers in Alaska, and the primary hub of Alaskan Serbs was in Juneau. In 1943, many Serbian-American miners were killed in the Smith Mine disaster in Montana. 

The number of Serbs who immigrated to the United States is difficult to determine as Serb immigrants were often variously classified by their country of origin, thus as Turks, Croats, Slovenes, Montenegrins, Dalmatians, Bosnians, Herzegovinians and Austro-Hungarians. In the 1910 census, there were 16,676 Serbs from Austria-Hungary, 4,321 from Serbia, and 3,724 from Montenegro.

Serbian-Americans volunteered in the First Balkan War. During World War I, as many as 15,000 Serbian-American volunteers returned to the Balkans to fight for the Allied cause in their homeland. Serbs in the United States who did not volunteer to fight marched for the creation of Yugoslavia, sent aid to the Balkans through the Red Cross, formed a Serbian Relief Committee, and urged notable Americans to support the Serbian cause.

Distinguished Serbian American scientist Mihajlo Pupin, a friend of U.S. President Woodrow Wilson, led the Serbian National Defence (SND), a Serbian-American organization which collected money and attempted to influence American public opinion with regard to the Balkans. During World War I, Pupin's Consulate in New York served as a center of Serbian-American diplomacy and volunteering of Serbian Americans to the Serbian front. In the 1912–18 period, thousands of Serbian-American volunteers came from Alaska and California.

After World War II many Serbs immigrated to the United States from Yugoslavia after the country came under the authoritarian rule of Communist leader Josip Broz Tito. Since then, many Serbian American cultural and religious organizations have been formed in the United States. A number of Serbian American engineers worked on the Apollo program.

With the fall of Communism and the disintegration of Yugoslavia, Serbs in the United States have established several interest groups, the most organized of which is the Serbian Unity Congress (SUC).

Alaska

Serbs (and Montenegrins) have lived in Alaska since the earliest days of American settlement in the 19th century. Many Serbs came in the Klondike Gold Rush in the late 1890s to seek fortune, just like they had done in the earlier California Gold Rush.

The primary areas of Serbian and Montenegrin settlement were Juneau, Douglas, Fairbanks, and Sitka. Many Serbs settled in the Canadian Yukon during the gold rush as well, such as legendary prospector Black Mike Vojnić.

In 1893, Serbian miners in Alaska built the Orthodox Church in Juneau alongside the native Orthodox Tlingit people, who had been converted to Orthodoxy by the Russians decades before. By World War I there were two Serbian societies established in Juneau and in Douglas (Saint Sava Church) for the preservation of Serbian and Russian customs and heritage in Alaska. In 1905 a newspaper called "The Serbian Montenegrin" was founded in Douglas.

St. Sava Church (also spelled "Savva") was a church of the Russian Mission that was located in Douglas, Alaska. Its construction was due, in no small part, to Fr. Sebastian Dabovich (now St. Sebastian of Jackson and San Francisco), who, in 1902, had been appointed Dean of the Sitka Deanery and the superintendent of Alaskan missions. Although under the Russian Orthodox Church, and a "daughter" parish of St. Nicholas Church in Juneau, St. Sebastian found it important that the Serbians that had come to the area— mostly to work in mining— had a church that was "home" to them. On July 23, 1903, Fr. Sebastian, along with Hieromonk Anthony (Deshkevich-Koribut) and the priest Aleksandar Yaroshevich, consecrated the Church of St. Sava in Douglas. However, the sparse records that remain of this church indicate that by the 1920s it may have been sitting empty, and in 1937 a fire swept through Douglas, destroying most of the town, including St. Sava Church.  It was not rebuilt.

Serbs also made up a large number of the miners at the Treadwell gold mine until its collapse in 1917 and subsequent closure in 1922. In 1907, during the union conflicts involving the Western Federation of Miners, two Serb miners were killed in an underground shaft; one was a union member, one was not. The funeral procession for the nonunion man was accompanied by a march from the Serbian Slavonic Hall and they ran into the union group of Serbs. The union Serbs demanded the nonunion deceased not be buried in the same cemetery, and some two hundred Serbs of both sides filled the streets. The U.S. Marshal and neutral townsmen had to calm the group in order for the funeral procession to continue. In 1910, there was a massive explosion on the 1,100 foot level of the Mexican mine at Treadwell. 39 men were killed, 17 of whom were Serbian.

During the World War I, many Serbian Americans volunteered to fight overseas, with thousands coming from Alaska.

In 1930s and 40s Fairbanks, Yugoslav immigrants, mainly Serbs and Montenegrins, owned a great number of businesses and bars in the city. In between the world wars, many Serbian Alaskan men returned to Yugoslavia to find brides and bring them back to Alaska to start families.

Today there is a vibrant Serbian community, particularly in Juneau, but Serbs can be found across the state.

Recently, it has become commonplace for Serbian workers to come to Alaska annually to work for a few months in canneries, where food and accommodation is provided. These workers stay on temporary work visas, and speak English.

Publications
Serbian Americans have historically published and continue to publish a number of newspapers in both the Serbian and English languages. The oldest Serbian American newspaper currently in publication is the Pittsburgh-based bilingual American Srbobran, which has been in circulation since 1906.

Notable Serbian newspapers published in the United States
Serb Sentinel (New York City), 1901–1923
Ujedinjeno srpstvo (Chicago), 1905–1948
American Srbobran (Pittsburgh), 1906–present
Radnička Borba (Cleveland/Detroit), 1907–1970
Srpska Borba (Chicago), 1946–?
The Path of Orthodoxy (Leetsdale), 1965–present
Srpska zora (Chicago), 1975–?
Ogledalo (Chicago), 2003–present

Population

Demographics

A total of 187,738 citizens of the United States declared Serb ethnicity in 2010 (while the 2012 American Community Survey has an estimate of 199,080). It is highly likely that among the citizens who declared Yugoslavian ethnicity (328,547 in 2010; 310,682 in 2012 estimation) are additional ethnic Serbs.

Major centers of Serbian settlement in the United States include Chicago, Los Angeles, New York City, Milwaukee (12,000), Pittsburgh, Phoenix, and Jackson, California.

Various ethnic organizations put the number of Serbian Americans at more than 350,000.

Serbian-born population
Serbian-born population in the U.S. since 2010:

Notable people

Notable Serbian Americans among others include recipients of the Medal of Honor such as World War I veterans Jake Allex and James I. Mestrovitch. In 1905, Rade Grbitch, a Serb from South Chicago, was awarded the Medal of Honor by the United States Navy for heroic action on the Pacific Coast (Interim Awards, 1901–1911). The most decorated Serbian veterans of World War II were Mitchell Paige and John W. Minick, both recipients of the Medal of Honor, and George Musulin, an officer of the Office of Strategic Services and naval intelligence, better known for Operation Halyard. In Vietnam, Lance Sijan, received the Medal of Honor posthumously. Butch Verich, Mele "Mel" Vojvodich, and Milo Radulovich are other notable veterans.  George Fisher was a 19th-century Serb settler who played an important role in the Texan Revolution.

Rose Ann Vuich was the first female member of the California State Senate. Helen Delich Bentley  is a former Republican member of the U.S. House of Representatives from the State of Maryland (1985–95). The port of Baltimore was named Helen Delich Bentley Port of Baltimore after her in 2006. Mike Stepovich was the last appointed governor of the Territory of Alaska in the 1950s.
Many notable Serbian Americans have been active in the fields of film and art, such as Slavko Vorkapić, Brad Dexter and Peter Bogdanovich. Karl Malden won an Oscar as Best Supporting Actor while Steve Tesich was Oscar-winning screenwriter, playwright and novelist. He won the Academy Award for Best Original Screenplay in 1979 for the movie Breaking Away. Predrag Bjelac is mostly known for his roles in Harry Potter and the Goblet of Fire and The Chronicles of Narnia: Prince Caspian. Catherine Oxenberg is an actress who is a daughter of Princess Jelisaveta Karađorđević, from Karađorđević Dynasty. Darko Tresnjak is a theatre and opera director born in Zemun, who won four Tony Awards in 2014.

Charles Simic and Dejan Stojanovic are notable poets. Gerald Petievich is a writer of crime novels (turned into movies) and Walt Bogdanich (1950) is an investigative journalist. He won the Pulitzer Prize for Specialized Reporting in 1985, the Pulitzer Prize for National Reporting in 2005 and the Pulitzer Prize for Investigative Reporting in 2008. Bogdanich led the team that won the 2008 Gerald Loeb Award for their story "Toxic pipeline". Branko Mikasinovich is a scholar of  literature as well as a noted Slavist and journalist. He has appeared as a panelist on Yugoslav press on ABC's "Press International" in Chicago and PBS's "International Dateline" in New Orleans. Alex N. Dragnich is the recipient of the Thomas Jefferson Award for distinguished service to Vanderbilt University, and he is author of numerous books on Serbian/Yugoslav history.

Nikola Tesla and Mihajlo Idvorski Pupin are world-known scientists. Another accomplished Serbian-American scientist, Miodrag Radulovački, was named the 2010 Inventor of the Year at the University of Illinois for producing a dozen potential therapies for sleep apnea.  Hall of fame basketball player, Pete Maravich (1947–1988) is listed among the 50 Greatest Players in NBA History. Sasha Knezev:  is a Serbian American filmmaker known for American Addict, American Addict 2, Fragments of Daniela and Welcome to San Pedro.

Predrag Radosavljević is a renowned former Serbian-American soccer player and famous for scoring a goal against Brazil, the then-no. 1 team, to help the United States defeat Brazil for the first time with a 1–0 win in 1998 CONCACAF Gold Cup.

In Alaska
Mike Stepovich, last appointed territorial Governor of Alaska; Serbian father
John Dapcevich, former Mayor of Sitka, Alaska
Marko Dapcevich, most recent former Mayor of Sitka, Alaska
Alex Miller, Alaskan statehood lobbyist
Frank Peratrovich, politician and businessman, President of the Alaska Native Brotherhood; Serbian father and native Tlingit mother
Bill Ray, politician
Steve Vukovich, politician
John Butrovich Jr., politician and businessman
John Hajdukovich, pioneer and entrepreneur in Big Delta
Mike Pusich, former Mayor of Douglas, Alaska

In popular culture
Tesla Nation, documentary film on Serbian Americans
Brad Dexter plays Senator East, who gives a Serbian lecture in the 1975 film Shampoo.
Craig Wasson plays a Serbian American, "Danilo Prozor", in the 1981 film Four Friends. In the film, Danilo has conflicts with his father, his struggle with his heritage, his lingering relationship with a girlfriend, and his thwarted marriage to a Long Island debutante.
Timothy Carhart plays a Serbian American detective, "Ian Zenovich", in the 1985 film Witness. The name Zenovich (originally Zenović) is of Serbian origin.
Sam Rockwell plays a Serbian-American boxer, "Pero Mahalovic", in the 2002 film Welcome to Collinwood. 
Tom Cruise plays a Serbian American, "Stefan Djordjevic", in the film All the Right Moves.
George Clooney's film Good Night and Good Luck, is based on the events surrounding the discharging of American Serb Milo Radulovich during the American Red Scare.
Simone Simon plays Serbian-born fashion designer, Irena Dubrovna, in the 1942 film Cat People. She also appears in The Curse of the Cat People, a 1944 sequel to Cat People.
Philip Dorn plays Draža Mihailović in the 1943 Hollywood film Chetniks! The Fighting Guerrillas.
In the 2008 video game Grand Theft Auto IV, the protagonist Niko Bellic is a Serbian who immigrated to the United States. There are some Serbian supporting characters in the game as well.
Diplomatic Siege (1999), American action film, features Serbian kidnappers demanding the release of a war criminal.
Killing Season (2013), American action thriller film, featuring feud between American and Serb veterans
Someone Else's America, a 1995 Goran Paskaljević film depicting the lives of a Serb illegal immigrant and his family in Long Island

See also

 St. Sava Church (Douglas, Alaska)
 Serbs
 List of Serbs
 Serbia-United States relations
 Serbs in Alaska
 Serbian Home
 Serbs in Canada
 Serbs in South America
 Saint Sava Serbian Orthodox Monastery and Seminary
 Trinity Chapel Complex
 New Gračanica Monastery
 Monastery of St. Paisius, Safford
 Saint Petka Serbian Orthodox Church
 Serbian Orthodox Eparchy of Eastern America
 Shadeland: Most Holy Mother Of God Monastery (Springboro, Pennsylvania)
 Sheffield Lake, Ohio: St. Mark Serbian Orthodox Monastery (Sheffield, Ohio)
 Richfield, Ohio: Synaxis: St. Archangel Gabriel Serbian Orthodox Monastery, also known as "New Marcha", Richfield, Ohio
 St. Nikolaj of Žiča Monastery (China, Michigan)
 Saint Sava Serbian Orthodox Church (Jackson, California)

Annotations

References

Further reading

 
 
 
 
 
 Kisslinger, J. The Serbian Americans (Chelsea House, 1990).
 
 
 
 
 
 
 Radovich, Milan. “The Serbian Press.” In The Ethnic Press in the United States: A Historical Analysis and Handbook, edited by Sally M. Miller, (Greenwood Press, 1987) pp 337–51. .
 
 
 Stevanović, Bosiljka. "Serbian Americans." in Gale Encyclopedia of Multicultural America, edited by Thomas Riggs, (3rd ed., vol. 4, Gale, 2014), pp. 133–149. online

External links

 USA SERBS/Serbian-American network
 Famous Serbian Americans
 Serbian National Defense Council of America
 Serb National Federation
 Serbs for Serbs
 Serb Life eMagazine
 About the notable Alaskan Serb Dapcevich family 

 
European-American society
 
Americans